Luirojärvi is a rather small lake of Finland. It is located in Urho Kekkonen National Park in Lapland region.

See also
List of lakes in Finland

References

Lakes of Sodankylä